Andrew Hughes (アンドリュー・ヒューズ, Andoryû Hyûzu, January 16, 1908 – September 1, 1996) was a Turkish-born actor and business executive best known for acting in several Japanese films. His most notable role was that of Adolf Hitler in the 1965 Japanese comedy The Crazy Adventure.

Hughes has also appeared in films such as King Kong Escapes (1967), Destroy All Monsters (1968), Tidal Wave (1973), ESPY (1974), and Sayonara Jupiter (1984). He also starred in the Hollywood films The Last Voyage (1960) and Flight from Ashiya (1964) (both partially filmed and set in Japan).

Career
Being virtually exclusively active in the Japanese film industry, Hughes was often cast in the roles of various Westerners, often portraying an international reporter, politician or foreign military officer. Not much is known about Hughes's early, pre-acting years, but it is known that he was born in Ottoman Turkey where he originally worked as a career businessman with some small-time acting experience as an extra. Actor Robert Dunham asserted that most fellow Western actors in Japan were in fact of Turkish origin as many Turks had fled to Japan after the Turkish revolution by way of China in order to avoid being drafted to the army. Hughes was ultimately based in Tokyo as an import-export businessman and eventually started making numerous appearances in Japanese films in a career that spanned from the late 1950s to the mid-1980s. As most Westerners appearing in Japanese films at the time spoke little or no Japanese, Hughes was dubbed by Japanese-speaking actors in most of his films.

Selected filmography

References

External links
 

1908 births
1996 deaths
Turkish male film actors
Turkish expatriates in Japan
Japanese male film actors
Turkish businesspeople
Japanese businesspeople
Japanese people of Turkish descent